"Yeah! Yeah! Yeah!" is a song performed by American contemporary R&B singer Simone Hines. It is the opening track on her eponymous debut album and was issued as the album's first single. The song was her only appearance on Billboard, peaking at #38 on the R&B chart in 1997.

Music video

The official music video for the song was directed by Christopher Erskin.

Chart positions

References

External links
 
 

1997 songs
American contemporary R&B songs
1997 debut singles
Epic Records singles
Music videos directed by Christopher Erskin
Song recordings produced by Rodney Jerkins
Songs written by Rodney Jerkins